The canton of Martel is an administrative division of the Lot department, southern France. Its borders were modified at the French canton reorganisation which came into effect in March 2015. Its seat is in Martel.

It consists of the following communes:
 
Baladou
Bétaille
Carennac
Cavagnac
Condat
Cressensac-Sarrazac
Creysse
Cuzance
Floirac
Martel
Montvalent
Saint-Denis-lès-Martel
Saint-Michel-de-Bannières
Strenquels
Vayrac
Le Vignon-en-Quercy

References

Cantons of Lot (department)